Eocyphinium is an extinct genus of trilobite from the Carboniferous.

Sources
 Fossils (Smithsonian Handbooks) by David Ward (Page 65)

Carboniferous trilobites
Proetidae
Proetida genera